The 2017 NCAA Division I Men's Golf Championship was the 79th annual tournament to determine the national champions of NCAA Division I men's golf. It was contested from May 26 to 31 at the Rich Harvest Farms course in Sugar Grove, Illinois and hosted by Northern Illinois University. Oklahoma defeated defending champions Oregon, 3.5–1.5 and Braden Thornberry of Mississippi won the individual competition.

Qualifying
The five teams with the lowest team scores qualified from each of the six regional tournaments for both the team and individual national championships.
The lowest scoring individual not affiliated with one of the qualified teams in their regional also qualified for the individual national championship.

Regional tournaments

Team competition

Leaderboard

Remaining teams: Arizona State (872), Alabama (873), Iowa State (875), North Carolina (875), Stanford (879), Kent State (881), Duke (888),  Mississippi (888), Penn State (891), Lipscomb (891), Jacksonville (892), New Mexico (892), Purdue (902), Kennesaw State (904), Clemson (905).

After 54 holes, the field of 30 teams was cut to the top 15.

Match play bracket
The eight teams with the lowest total scores advanced to the match play bracket.

Source:

Individual competition

The field was cut after 54 holes to the top 15 teams and the top nine individuals not on a top 15 team. These 84 players competed for the individual championship.

References

NCAA Men's Golf Championship
Golf in Illinois
NCAA Division I Men's Golf Championship
NCAA Division I Men's Golf Championship
NCAA Division I Men's Golf Championship
NCAA Division I Men's Golf Championship